Friedrich Rudolf Max Laurence (5 August 1852 – 26 May 1926) was a German stage and film actor.

Selected filmography
 Where Is Coletti? (1913)
 The Dancer (1915)
 Hans und Hanni (1915)
 Mountain Air (1917)
 Diary of a Lost Woman (1918)
 Verlorene Töchter (1918)
 Die Augen der Mumie Ma (1918)
 Blonde Poison (1919)
 The Toy of the Tsarina (1919)
 The Secret of the American Docks (1919)
 Between Two Worlds (1919)
 The Last Sun Son (1919)
 The Golden Lie (1919)
 Veritas Vincit (1919)
 The World Champion (1919)
 The Apache of Marseilles (1919)
 Colonel Chabert (1920)
 Gypsy Blood (1920)
 Indian Revenge (1920)
 The Flying Car (1920)
 Jimmy: The Tale of a Girl and Her Bear (1923)

Bibliography
 Hardt, Ursula. From Caligari to California: Erich Pommer's Life in the International Film Wars. Berghahn Books, 1996.

External links

1852 births
1926 deaths
German male film actors
German male stage actors
German male silent film actors
Male actors from Berlin
20th-century German male actors